Dana Eric Hall (born July 8, 1969) is a former professional American football player who was selected by the San Francisco 49ers in the 1st round (18th overall) of the 1992 NFL Draft. A 6'2", 206-lb. safety from the University of Washington, Hall played in 6 NFL seasons from 1992 to 1994 with the 49ers, 1995 with the Cleveland Browns, and 1996 to 1997 with the Jacksonville Jaguars.

Hall attended Ganesha High School in Pomona, California. As of the fall of 2010, Hall was a defensive backs coach at San Bernardino Valley College; during his tenure there, the team won their first conference title in 13 years.  Currently, Hall is coaching at Chaffey College in Rancho Cucamonga, California.

References

1969 births
Living people
American football safeties
Cleveland Browns players
Jacksonville Jaguars players
San Francisco 49ers players
Sportspeople from Los Angeles County, California
Washington Huskies football players
People from Bellflower, California
Players of American football from California